Thelidomus is a genus of air-breathing land snails, terrestrial pulmonate gastropod mollusks in the family Pleurodontidae. 

This genus is endemic to Jamaica.

Species 
Species within the genus Thelidomus include:
 Thelidomus aspera (Férussac, 1821)
 Thelidomus cognatus (Férussac, 1821)

References

 Férussac, A.E.J.P.F. d'Audebard de. , 1819-1832 - Histoire naturelle générale et particulière des mollusques terrestres et fluviatiles tant des espèces que l’on trouve aujourd’hui vivantes, que des dépouilles fossiles de celles qui n’existent plus; classés d’après les caractères essentiels que presentment ces animaux et leurs coquilles. Tome deuxième
 Bank, R. A. (2017). Classification of the Recent terrestrial Gastropoda of the World. Last update: July 16th, 2017
 Nomenclator Zoologicus info

External links 
 Swainson, W. (1840). A treatise on malacology or shells and shell-fish. London, Longman. viii + 419 pp
 Albers, J. C. (1850). Die Heliceen nach natürlicher Verwandtschaft systematisch geordnet. Berlin: Enslin. 262 pp

Pleurodontidae
Endemic fauna of Jamaica
Gastropod genera